ITMO may refer to:

 ITMO University, a university in Saint Petersburg, Russia
 Internationally Transferred Mitigation Outcomes, units from the mechanism for international emissions trading between Parties to the Paris Agreement